Privateer is the second album by British guitarist Tim Renwick, only available on Audio License, released in 2007 as the follow-up to his 1980s Tim Renwick album.

A collection of instrumental folk/jazz/rock pieces, it features all instruments played by Renwick himself, with various guest musicians.

Track listing 
All tracks by Tim Renwick.

 "Nighthawk" -3:18    
 "Cornish Patsy" -3:22
 "Gridlock" -3:13 
 "Polly's Song" 3:34
 "Bertholletia Excelsa" -3:12
 "Texas Nexus" -3:34
 "Rolling" -2:47  
 "Slideaway" -3:39
 "Open Road" -3:55
 "Blue Monday" -3:45 
 "Strumtastic" -2:52
 "Rockabilly Jo" -3:30 
 "Bertholletia Excelsa (Acoustic Reprise)" -2:20

Non-album tracks 

 "Gladsome Girl" -2:58
 "Miami Beach" -3:00     
 "Right As Rain" (Tim Renwick, Elfed Hayes) -3:38
 "Righteous Road" (Tim Renwick, Elfed Hayes) -3:51
 "Gridlock" -3:13    
 "Freehand" -3:51
 "Boogie Shuffle" -3:33     
 "Getting Jiggie" -3:29
 "Dirty Man Blues" -2:20      
 "Way To Go" -3:44 
 "The Shore" -2:16     
 "Masquerade" -2:16     
 "Gladsome Christmas" -2:58
 "Consort" -2:18

Personnel 

Tim Renwick - all instruments
Guy Pratt - bass guitar (Tracks 1, 4, 5, 9, 13)
Paul Harris - keyboards (Tracks 1, 3, 4, 5, 9, 10, 13)
Henry Spinetti - drums, percussion
Steve Jackson - drums, percussion (Tracks 2, 11)
Frank Ricotti - percussion (Tracks 1, 4, 5, 8, 13)
Willie Wilson - tambourine (Tracks 3, 10)
Alan Glen - harmonica (Tracks 10, 12)
Steve Turner - National steel guitar (on "Slideaway")
Martin Bell - fiddle (on "Slideaway")

2007 albums
Tim Renwick albums